The 1928 Winter Olympics, officially known as the II Olympic Winter Games and commonly known as St. Moritz 1928, was an international winter multi-sport event that was celebrated from 11 to 19 February 1928 in St. Moritz, Switzerland.

The 1928 Games were the first true Winter Olympics to be held as a stand-alone event, not in conjunction with a Summer Olympics. The preceding 1924 Winter Games were retroactively renamed the inaugural Winter Olympics, although they had in fact been organised alongside the 1924 Summer Olympics in France. Before 1924, the winter events were included in the schedule of the Summer Games and there were no separate Winter Games. The 1928 Winter Games also replaced the now redundant Nordic Games, which had been held at varying intervals since early in the 20th century.

The hosts were challenged by fluctuating weather conditions; the opening ceremony was held in a blizzard, while warm weather conditions plagued sporting events throughout the rest of the Games. The 10,000 metre speed-skating event was controversially abandoned and officially cancelled. Filmed footage of the games exists in a silent, feature-length documentary, The White Stadium.

Highlights 

 Sonja Henie of Norway returned to the Winter Olympics, having taken part in 1924 at the age of 11, and made history by winning the ladies' figure skating aged 15. She became the youngest Olympic champion in history (a distinction she held for 70 years), and went on to defend her title at the next two Winter Olympics.
 Norway's Ivar Ballangrud won the Olympic title in the 5,000-metre speed skating event, and Clas Thunberg of Finland won both the 500 m and the 1,500 m.
 Norway finished at the top of the medal table with a total of six gold medals, four silver, and five bronze, totalling 15 medals. The United States finished second in the table with six medals overall.
 Switzerland won a single bronze medal, the lowest medal haul by a host nation at any Olympic Games.
 American Irving Jaffee was leading the 10,000-metre speed skating race, having outskated Norwegian defending world champion Bernt Evensen in their heat, when rising temperatures thawed the ice. In a controversial ruling, the Norwegian referee cancelled the entire competition; the International Olympic Committee stepped in to reverse the referee's decision and awarded Jaffee the gold medal, but the International Skating Union later overruled the IOC and restored the ruling. Evensen, for his part, stated publicly that Jaffee should be awarded the gold medal, but that did not happen.

Events 
Medals were awarded in 14 events contested in 4 sports (8 disciplines).
Bobsleigh

Ice skating

Demonstration sports
 Military patrol
 Skijoring

Venues

 St. Moritz Olympic Ice Rink – Figure skating, Ice hockey, Speed skating
 Around the hills of St. Moritz – Cross-country skiing, Nordic combined (cross-country skiing)
 Olympiaschanze St. Moritz – Nordic combined (ski jumping), Ski jumping
 St. Moritz-Celerina Olympic Bobrun – Bobsleigh
 Cresta Run – Skeleton

Participating nations
Athletes from 25 nations competed at these Games, up from 16 in 1924.  Nations making their first appearance at the Winter Olympic Games were Argentina (first participation of a delegation coming from a country belonging to the Southern Hemisphere), Estonia, Germany, Japan, Lithuania, Luxembourg, Mexico, the Netherlands, and Romania.

Number of athletes by National Olympic Committees

<noinclude>

Medal count

Podium sweeps

See also
 List of 1928 Winter Olympics medal winners

References

External links

 
 The program of the 1928 St. Moritz Winter Olympics
 The official report of St. Moritz 1928 (French only)

 
Olympic Games in Switzerland
Winter Olympics by year
1928 in Swiss sport
1928 in multi-sport events
Sport in St. Moritz
February 1928 sports events
Winter sports competitions in Switzerland